WGBD-LD, channel 17 (virtual channel 49), is a low-powered repeater station operated by Daystar serving Green Bay and northeastern Wisconsin. The station's city of license is Green Bay, with the station's digital transmitter located in the Town of Glenmore like the other Green Bay stations.

The station previously operated in analog in the era when it acted as a translator for the Trinity Broadcasting Network, but flash cut to digital broadcasting in 2011 when TBN sold it to Daystar.

References

External links
Daystar Official website

Television channels and stations established in 1988
Television stations in Green Bay, Wisconsin
Low-power television stations in the United States